GrexIt is a software firm that released collaboration software of the same name, notable for its market presence in the field of email-based collaboration. The product, GrexIt, Renamed to Hiver (2015), is a software as a service application that helps organizations collaborate from their email inboxes. It allows teams to share email conversations and work together on sales, support, hiring, project management and operations.

The core of GrexIt's functionality is Shared Labels in Gmail, with which users can share and sync email conversations with their colleagues using labels in their Google Apps email. They can also add email conversations to a shared email repository that is hosted with GrexIt, and is easily searchable and browsable.

Hiver 
In August 2015, GrexIt renamed its product to Hiver with increase functionalities from email-boxes. It now incorporates email project management among other services.

History
GrexIt’s Beta was launched in 2011, with a small set of features focused on helping companies collaborate without having to leave their email inboxes. GrexIt was then publicly launched in 2012.

As of October 2012, it competes with other similar products like Basecamp, Zendesk, Streak and Huddle.

See also
List of collaborative software
List of project management software
Project management software
Web 2.0

References

External links
Citrix: GrexIt - getting knowledge out of email inboxes
Betakit: GrexIt launches to bring collaboration tools to business users inbox
R&D Magazine: GrexIt launches email collaboration  for Google Apps Users
TheNextWeb: GrexIt launches Shared Labels for Gmail users
GigaOm: Build a shared knowledge base from your inbox with GrexIt

External links

Collaborative software